Declan McLaughlin, better known by his stage name Decky Hedrock, is an electronic music musician from Derry, Northern Ireland. A former member of the Northern Irish electro outfit The Japanese Popstars, Hedrock left the group in 2012 to pursue his career as Sirkus Sirkuz.  Previous to that Declan was in Hedrock Valley Beats, another award-winning electronic act which received various chart success in different countries around the globe including a No.1 in Australia and National Airplay No.1 in the USA.
 
In his career, he has remixed songs by artists including Beyoncé, Depeche Mode, Ash, James, Benny Benassi, Kylie Minogue, and Gorillaz, under various aliases. He has also toured with Crookers, Vitalic, Bookashade, Deadmau5 as well as collaborating with the likes of Jon Spencer (Blues Explosion), Morgan Kibby of M83, and many others.

Sirkuz Sirkuz is also known to be the first ever artist to release three EPs with one record label on the same day. 'The Trilogy EP' was released on 3 November 2012 on 9G Records.

He hosted his own monthly dance show on Ireland largest radio station RTÉ 2fm called 'Sirkus Sirkuz Presents' and ‘The Decky Hedrock Show’.

Currently recording music with the band Last Survivor

Discography

Singles/EPs

Hedrock Valley Beats – ‘Radio Beatbox’ on Brightstar Recordings
Hedrock Valley Beats – ‘Coming Thru (My Stereo)’ on Infectious Records
Hedrock Valley Beats – ‘Non-Stop’ on Freakaboom Recordings
Hedrock Valley Beats – ‘King Of Rock’ on Freakaboom Recordings
Hedrock Valley Beats – ‘Radio Beatbox’ on Freakaboom Recordings
Sirkus Sirkuz – ‘Rapier’ on 9G Records
Sirkus Sirkuz – ‘Plastic Explosive’ on 9G Records
Sirkus Sirkuz – ‘Little Rodent’ on 9G Records
Sirkus Sirkuz – ‘Telefunk’ on 9G Records
Shadow Dancer Vs Sirkus Sirkuz – ‘Build / Use’ on GND Records
Sirkus Sirkuz – ‘Forgiveness’
Shadow Dancer Vs Sirkus Sirkuz – ‘Build / Use REMIXED’ on GND Records
Sirkus Sirkuz feat. Deci Gallen– ‘Break The Silence' on Hottwerk Records
Sirkus Sirkuz Vs March Against feat. Wyldling - 'The Tempest' on 9G Records
Sirkus Sirkuz - 'Trouble Bug' on CRUX Records
Peter Silbermann Vs Sirkus Sirkuz - 'Keep On Giving' on Rocstar Records
Sirkus Sirkuz - 'Ass Boogie' on 9G Records
Sirkus Sirkuz - 'Annihilating Rhythm' on 9G Records
Sirkus Sirkuz - 'Ghostcheck' on SoundCloud
Wax Hands & Sirkus Sirkuz - 'Acid Elephant' on Toastclub Recordings
Nitemode & Sirkus Sirkuz - 'Ravival' on CRUX Records
Sirkus Sirkuz - 'Dying Star' on 9G Records
Sirkus Sirkuz - 'Ahhhh-Seid Love' on SoundCloud
Sirkus Sirkuz - 'Rave On' on My Techno Weighs A Ton
Sirkus Sirkuz - 'Nothing Changes' on SoundCloud
Sirkus Sirkuz - 'Probe Droid' on RDL47 Records
Sirkus Sirkuz - 'The Try Outs / Wolfrider EP' on Vox Nox Records
Sirkus Sirkuz - 'Paranoid' on Whartone Records
Sirkus Sirkuz - 'Rattle Meat' on Whartone Records
Sirkus Sirkuz feat. Jilly St John - 'Discozone' on Whartone Records
Sirkus Sirkuz Feat. Mark Zowie - 'I Know' on Whartone Records
Last Survivor - 'Waste Away' on Atlantic Traxx
Last Survivor - 'Staring At The Moon' on Riot Synth Roit Records
Last Survivor - 'The Wasp' on Riot Synth Riot Records
Last Survivor - 'Midnight Run' on Riot Synth Riot Records

Remixes

Crossfaders feat. Chuckie Campell – ‘Four Elements (Sirkus Sirkuz Mix)' on 9G Records
Run Riot – ‘Lose Yourself (Sirkus Sirkuz Mix)’ on Skint Records
Moorr – ‘Spaceboy Goes To Vegas (Sirkus Sirkuz Mix)’ on 9G Records
Replicants – ‘ETA (Sirkus Sirkuz Mix)’ on Psychonavigation Records
Shane Fontane – ‘All I Need (Sirkus Sirkuz Mix)’ on 9G Records
4 Quarters Boyz – ‘Future (Sirkus Sirkuz Mix)’ on Crux Records
Maud In Cahoots - 'Dance With Me'
Tijuana – ‘Heaven Bound (Sirkus Sirkuz Mix)’ on Rocstar Records
A Plastic Rose – ‘Kids Dont Behave Like This (Sirkus Sirkuz Mix)’ on Di Di Mau Records
Nerd Flanders - 'Retsina (Sirkus Sirkuz Mix)' on My Techno Weighs A Ton
Unique 3 - 'Feels All Good (Sirkus Sirkuz Mix)' on Rocstar Records
Adam Schock & Ed Liner - 'Heart (Sirkus Sirkuz Mix)' on Tanz Kultur Records
Cakeboy - 'Damage (Sirkus Sirkuz Mix)' on Rocstar Records
DPPLGNGRS - 'Poindexter (Sirkus Sirkuz Mix)' on Hotwerk Records
Rob DeLarge - 'A Deep And Gorgeous Thirst (Sirkus Sirkuz Mix)' on RDL47 Records
I Need? - 'Paranoid (Sirkus Sirkuz Mix)' on CRUX Records
Galactus - 'The Gauntlet (Sirkus Sirkuz Mix)' on 9G Records
Sovnger - 'Catharsis (Sirkus Sirkuz Mix)' on Police Records
Cut La Roc - 'Freeze (Sirkus Sirkuz Mix)' on Skint Records
Rory Lyons and Doorly - 'Sun Rising (Sirkus Sirkuz Mix)' on Free download
Zeskullz - 'Devil (Sirkus Sirkuz Mix)' on Vicious B1tch Records

References

External links
Mixmag.net
Dmcworld.net

British electronic musicians
Musicians from Derry (city)
Place of birth missing (living people)
Year of birth missing (living people)
Living people